Debreceni VSC is a professional football club, based in Debrecen, Hungary.

Manager

Managerial statistics
As of 26 July 2017

Player

Most appearances

Top scorers

Zilahi prize

2000:  Zsolt Vadicska
2001:  Csaba Sándor
2002:  Zoltán Böőr
2003:  Tibor Dombi
2004:  Tamás Sándor
2005:  Péter Halmosi
2006:  Tamás Sándor
2007:  Ibrahima Sidibe
2008:  Zsombor Kerekes
2009:  Gergely Rudolf
2010:  Péter Czvitkovics
2011:  András Herczeg
2012:  József Varga
2013:  Adamo Coulibaly
2014:  Nenad Novaković
2015:  József Varga
2016:  Norbert Mészáros
2017:  Dusan Brkovic

Record departures

Record arrivals

References

External links

Debreceni VSC
Hungarian football club statistics